("Eastern worker") was a Nazi German designation for foreign slave workers gathered from occupied Central and Eastern Europe to perform forced labor in Germany during World War II. The Germans started deporting civilians at the beginning of the war and began doing so at unprecedented levels following Operation Barbarossa in 1941. They apprehended Ostarbeiter from the newly-formed German districts of Reichskommissariat Ukraine, District of Galicia (itself attached to the General Government), and Reichskommissariat Ostland. These areas comprised German-occupied Poland and the conquered territories of the Soviet Union. According to Pavel Polian, over 50% of Ostarbeiters were formerly Soviet subjects originating from the territory of modern-day Ukraine, followed by Polish women workers (approaching 30% of the total). Eastern workers included ethnic Ukrainians, Poles, Belarusians, Russians, Armenians, Tatars, and others. Estimates of the number of Ostarbeiter range between 3 million and 5.5 million.

By 1944, most new workers were under the age of 16 because those older were usually conscripted for service in Germany; 30% were as young as 12–14 years of age when taken from their homes. The age limit was reduced to 10 in November 1943. Ostarbeiter were often the victims of rape, and tens of thousands of pregnancies due to rape occurred.

Ostarbeiter often received starvation rations and were forced to live in guarded labor camps. Many died from starvation, overwork, bombing (they were frequently denied access to bomb shelters), abuse, and execution carried out by their German overseers. These workers were often denied wages; when they did get paid, they received payment in a special currency which could only be used to buy specific products at the camps where they lived.

Following the war, the occupying powers repatriated many of the over 2.5 million liberated Ostarbeiter. Those returning to the USSR suffered from social ostracism. American authorities banned the repatriation of Ostarbeiter in October 1945, and some of them immigrated to the U.S. as well as to other non eastern-bloc countries. In 2000 the German government and thousands of German companies made a one-time payment of just over € 5 billion to Ostarbeiter victims of the Nazi regime.

Terminology

The official German records for the late summer of 1944 listed 7.6 million foreign civilian workers and prisoners of war in the territory of the "Greater German Reich", who for the most part had been brought there by force. Thus, they represent roughly a quarter of all registered workers in the entire economy of the German Reich at that time.

A class system was created amongst the Fremdarbeiter (foreign workers) brought to Germany. The multi-layered system was based on layers of national hierarchies. The Gastarbeitnehmer, the so-called "guest workers" from Germanic countries, Scandinavia, and Italy, had the highest status. The Zwangsarbeiter (forced workers) included Militärinternierte (military internees), POWs, Zivilarbeiter (civilian workers); and primarily Polish prisoners from the General Government. They received reduced wages and food rations and had to work longer hours than the former, could not use public facilities (such as public transportation, restaurants, or churches), were forbidden to possess certain items and some were required to wear a sign – the "Polish P" – attached to their clothing. The Ostarbeiter were the Eastern workers, primarily from Reichskommissariat Ukraine. They were marked with a badge reading "OST" (East) and were subject to even harsher conditions than the civilian workers. They were forced to live in special camps that were fenced with barbed wire and under guard, and were particularly exposed to the arbitrariness of the Gestapo and the commercial industrial plant guards. At the end of the war 5.5 million Ostarbeiter were returned to the USSR.

History
At the end of 1941, a new crisis developed in Germany. Following the mobilization of men into its massive armies, the country faced a shortage of labour in support of its war industries. To help overcome this shortage, Göring decreed to bring in people from the territories seized during Operation Barbarossa in Central and Eastern Europe. These workers were called Ostarbeiter. The crisis deepened as the war with the Soviet Union went on. By 1944, the policy turned into mass abductions of virtually anyone to fulfill the labour needs of the Organisation Todt among other similar projects; 40,000 to 50,000 Polish children aged 10 to 14 were kidnapped by the German occupational forces and transported to Germany proper as slave labourers during the so-called Heuaktion. The Heuaktion was an acronym for allegedly homeless, parentless and unhoused children gathered in lieu of their guardians. After arriving in Germany, the children were handed over to Reich Labour Service or the Junkers aircraft works. The secondary purpose of these abductions was to pressure the adult populations further to register in place of children.

Recruitment and kidnapping

Initially a recruiting campaign was launched in January 1942 by Fritz Sauckel for workers to go to Germany. "On January 28 the first special train will leave for Germany with hot meals in Kiev, Zdolbunov and Przemyśl", offered an announcement. The first train was full when it departed from Kiev on January 22.

The advertising continued in the following months. "Germany calls you! Go to Beautiful Germany! 100,000 Ukrainians are already working in free Germany. What about you?" ran a Kiev newspaper ad on March 3, 1942. Word got back however, of the sub-human slave conditions that Ukrainians met in Germany and the campaign failed to attract sufficient volunteers. Forced recruitment was implemented, although propaganda still depicted them as volunteers.

With the news about the terrible conditions many Ostarbeiter faced in Germany the pool of volunteers soon dried up. As a result, the Germans were forced to resort to mass round-ups, often using the ploy of targeting large gatherings such as church congregations and crowds at sporting events, with entire groups simply marched off at gunpoint to waiting cattle trucks and deported to Germany.

Nannies

One special category was that of young women recruited to act as nannies; Hitler argued that many women would like to have children, and many of them were restricted by the lack of domestic help.  (This was one of many efforts made to promote the birth rate.)  Since the nannies would be in close company with German children as well as in a position where they might be sexually exploited, they were required to be suitable for Germanization.  Himmler spoke of thus winning back German blood and benefiting the women, too, who would have a social rise through working in Germany and even the chance to marry there.  They could be assigned only to families with many children who would properly train the nannies as well.  These assignments were carried out by the NS-Frauenschaft. Originally, this recruitment was carried out only in the annexed territories of Poland, but the lack of women who passed screening extended it to all of Poland, and also to occupied territories in USSR.

Conditions
Within Germany Ostarbeiter lived either in private camps owned and managed by the large companies, or in special camps guarded by privately paid police services known as the Werkschutz. They worked an average of 12 hours a day, six days a week. They were paid approximately 30% of German workers' wages; however, most of the money went toward food, clothing and board. The labor authorities, the RSHA Arbeitskreis, complained that many firms viewed these former Soviet civilian workers as "civilian prisoners", treated them accordingly, and paid no wages at all to them.  Those who received pay got specially printed paper money and savings stamps, which they could use only for the purchase of a limited number of items in special camp stores.  By law they were given worse food rations than other forced labor groups. Starvation rations and primitive accommodation were given to these unfortunates in Germany.

The Ostarbeiter were restricted to their compounds, in some cases labor camps.  Being ethnically Slavic, they were classified by German authorities as the Untermenschen ("sub-humans"), who could be beaten, terrorized, and killed for their transgressions.  Those who tried to escape were hanged where other workers could see their bodies. Leave without authorization or escape was punished by death. The Nazis issued a ban on sexual relations between Germans and the Easterners.  On 7 December 1942 Himmler called for any "unauthorized sexual intercourse" to be punishable by death. In accordance with these new racial laws all sexual relations, even those that did not result in pregnancy, were severely punished as Rassenschande (racial pollution). During the war, hundreds of Polish and Russian men were executed for their sexual relations with German women, even though the main offenders by far – wrote Ulrich Herbert – were the French and Italian civilian workers who were not prohibited from social contacts with them.

Rape of female Ostarbeiter was extremely common and led to tens of thousands of pregnancies caused by rape. The victims began giving so many unwanted births that hundreds of special Nazi birthing centres for foreign workers had to be created in order to dispose of their infants.

Many Ostarbeiter died when Allied bombing raids targeted the factories where they worked and the German authorities refused to allow them into bomb shelters. Many also perished because the German authorities ordered that "they should be worked to death".

Nazi authorities attempted to reproduce such conditions on  farms, ordering farmers to integrate the workers into their workforce while enforcing total social separation, including not permitting them to eat at the same table, but this proved far more difficult to enforce.  Sexual relationships in particular were able to take place despite efforts to raise German women's "racial consciousness".  When Germany's military situation worsened, these workers' conditions often improved as the farmers tried to protect themselves against a defeat.

Native German workers served as foremen and supervisors over the forced labour in factories, and therefore no solidarity developed between foreigners and German nationals. The German workers became accustomed to inequalities raised by racism against the workers and became indifferent to their plight.

Statistics

During the German occupation of Central and Eastern Europe in World War II (1941–44) over 3 million people were taken to Germany as Ostarbeiter. Some estimates put the number up to 5.5 million. Between two-thirds and three-quarters of the over 3,000,000 Ostarbeiter were Ukrainians. Prof. Kondufor's statistic is that 2,244,000 Ukrainians were forced into slave labor in Germany during World War II. Another statistic puts the total at 2,196,166 for Ukrainian Ostarbeiter slaves in Germany (Dallin, p. 452). Both of these statistics probably exclude the several hundreds of thousands of Ukrainians from Halychyna, so a final total could be about 2.5 million.

There were slightly more female than male Ostarbeiter. They were employed in agriculture, mining, manufacturing armaments, metal production, and railroads. Ostarbeiter were initially sent to intermediate camps, where laborers were picked out for their assignments directly by representatives of labor-starved companies. Ford-Werke in Cologne and Opel in Rüsselsheim and Brandenburg each employed thousands of such Ostarbeiter at their plants.

Some Ostarbeiter worked for private firms, although many were employed in the factories making armaments. These factories were prime targets for Allied bombing. The Ostarbeiter were considered to be quite productive and efficient. Males were thought to be the equivalent of 60-80% of a German worker, and women — 90-100%. Two million Ukrainians worked mostly in the armaments factories including the V-2 rocket factory at Peenemünde.

According to Alexander Dallin, as of December 1944, the numbers of deployment were such:

Pregnancy

To prevent Rassenschande (violation of German racial laws by the native Germans), the farmers were given propaganda leaflets about miscegenation, which were completely ineffective. The rampant sexual abuse of Polish and Soviet female Ostarbeiters at the hands of their overseers led to tens of thousands of unwanted births. A staggering 80 percent of rapes occurred on the farms where the Polish girls worked. The newborns were secretly euthanized in Nazi birthing centres. At Arbeitslagers the infants were killed on site. The Western factory workers had brothels. Easterners did not. They were supposed to be recruited in equal numbers of men and women, so brothels would not be needed. Female labourers were always housed in separate barracks. Nevertheless, they were suspected by the SS of "cheating their way out of work" by conceiving. The earlier policy of sending them home to give birth, was replaced by the Reichsführer-SS in 1943 with a special abortion decree. Contrary to the Nazi law against German abortions, the Ostarbeiter women were usually forced to abort.

Occasionally, when the female worker and the baby's father were "of good blood" (for example, Norwegian), the child might prove "racially valuable." In such cases, the parentage was investigated and both parents tested.  If they passed, the woman would be permitted to give birth, and the child was removed for Germanization.  If the woman was found particularly suitable, she might be placed at a Lebensborn institution. However, when the born children did not pass, they were put in the Ausländerkinder-Pflegestätte facilities, where up to 90 percent of them would die a torturous death due to calculated abandonment.

In some rural areas, the authorities found that the German farm-wives were inclined to care for children born to their workers, along with their own children. Attempts were made to segregate these children and use ruthless propaganda to establish that if a worker of "alien blood" gave birth in Germany, it meant immediate and total separation from the child. Repeated efforts were made to propagate Volkstum (racial consciousness) in order to prevent Rassenschande between Germans and foreign workers, nevertheless, the arrival of trains with Polish girls in German towns and villages usually turned into sex slave markets.

Medical experiments
As a result of their abusive treatment Ostarbeiter suffered from high levels of psychological trauma, and those who were admitted to psychiatric hospitals were often the victims of abuse and murder. The Nazi regime also sanctioned the use of Ostarbeiter in medical experiments.

On September 6, 1944 the Reichsminister of the Interior ordered the establishment of special units for Ostarbeiter in several psychiatric hospitals in the Reich. The reason given was: "With the considerable number of Ostarbeiter who have been brought to the German Reich as a labour force, their admission into German psychiatric hospitals as mentally ill patients has become more frequent ...
With the shortage of space in German hospitals, it is irresponsible to treat these ill people, who in the foreseeable future will not be fit for work, for a prolonged period in German institutions. "The exact number of Ostarbeiter killed in these psychiatric institutions is as yet not known. 189 Ostarbeiter were admitted to the Ostarbeiter unit of the Heil- und Pflegeanstalt Kaufbeuren; 49 died as a result of the starvation diet, or from deadly injections.

Repatriation

After the war many of the Ostarbeiter were initially placed in DP (displaced person) camps from which they were then moved to Kempten for processing and returned to their country of origin, primarily the USSR. The Soviets also used special Agit brigades to convince many Ostarbeiter to return.

Many Ostarbeiter were still children or young teenagers when they were taken away and wanted to return home to their parents. Others who became aware of or understood the postwar political reality declined to return. Those in the Soviet occupational zones were returned automatically. Those in the French and British zones of occupation were forced to return under the terms of the Yalta Agreement, which stated that "Citizens of the Soviet Union and of Yugoslavia were to be handed over to their respective countries, regardless of their consent".

In October 1945, General Eisenhower banned the use of force in repatriation in the American Zone. As a result, many Ostarbeiter began to escape to the American Zone. Some, when faced with return to Soviet reality, chose to commit suicide.

Upon return to the Soviet Union Ostarbeiter were often treated as traitors. Many were transported to remote locations in the Soviet Union and were denied basic rights and the chance to get further education. Those who returned home were also physically and spiritually broken. Moreover, they were considered by the authorities to have "questionable loyalty", and were therefore discriminated against and deprived of many of their citizenship rights.

Ostarbeiter suffered from state-sanctioned stigmatisation, with special references in their passports (and the passports of their children and relatives) mentioning their time in Germany during the war. As a result, many jobs were off-limits to anyone unlucky enough to carry such a status, and during periods of repression former slave labourers would often be ostracised by the wider Soviet community. Many victims have testified that since the war they have suffered a lifetime of abuse and suspicion from their fellow countrymen, many of whom have accused them of being traitors who helped the Germans and lived comfortably in the Third Reich while Ukraine burned.

Pensions and retribution
In 2000 the Foundation "Remembrance, Responsibility and Future", a project of the German Federal Government and 6,500 companies of the German Industry Foundation Initiative, was established, which disbursed 10 billion Deutsche Mark (5.1 billion €) to the former forced laborers. This is roughly one-off payment of €2,000 per worker, much less than the inflation-adjusted value of their work. Of the over 2 million Ostarbeiter in Ukraine, 467,000 received a total amount of €867 million, with each worker being assigned a one-time payment of 4,300 marks.  The last payments were made in 2007.

Research
Published eyewitness accounts of the Ukrainian Ostarbeiter experience are virtually non-existent in Ukraine although there were 2,244,000 of them from Ukraine, according to Ukrainian historian Yuri Kondufor. The State Archival Service of Ukraine now has a collection of documents online showing official notices published by the German government of occupation in Ukraine. A total of 3,000,000 Ostarbeiter were taken to Germany, and it is estimated that Ukrainians constituted about 75% of the total. Ukraine, according to some sources, lost about 10 million people in World War II, which was one of the greatest losses of any country in the war.

Some Ostarbeiter survived the war and were forced to emigrate to the countries outside Europe, primarily to the United States, although a handful also made it to Argentina, Australia, Canada, and Brazil. Ostarbeiter who found themselves in the British or French zones were automatically repatriated. Only those who were in the American zone were not forced to return to their countries of origin. In comparison, Ukrainians from western Ukraine and the Baltic region were not forced to return to the Soviet Union, because the UK did not recognize those territories as part of the USSR.

See also
 Deutsche Wirtschaftsbetriebe, Nazi German Economic Enterprises, DWB
 Generalplan Ost and the Hunger Plan to use and abuse people in Central and Eastern Europe
 German mistreatment of Soviet prisoners of war
 Kidnapping of children by Nazi Germany
 Zivilarbeiter forced laborers in the Third Reich
 Polenlager
 Polish decrees

References
Notes

Bibliography
Berliner Unterwelten e.V. (2010),  "OST-Arbeiter" Dokumentartheater Berlin production. 
Billstein, Reinhold editor (November 2000) Working for the Enemy: Ford, General Motors, and Forced Labor in Germany During the Second World War Berghahn Books. 
 Gregorovich, Andrew (1995) "World War II in Ukraine: Ostarbeiter Slave Labor" InfoUkes: Ukrainian History; reprint from Forum: A Ukrainian Review by Ukrainian Fraternal Association, Scranton, Pennsylvania.
 
 Petrenko, Liebe (2000) "Третій шлях німецьких католиків" OST-ARBEITER ("The Third road for Germans Catholics"), POSTUP/BRAMA № 136 (580), Ukrainian.
An Ostarbeiters Employment Identification Document
 Павел Полян - Остарбайтеры
 Колиншні остарбайтери вважають, що їх обдурили
 КОЛИШНI ОСТАРБАЙТЕРИ В НIМЕЧЧИНI
 "Europe at Work in Germany" propaganda aimed at Germans about the program

Nazi war crimes in Germany
Forced migration
Eastern Front (World War II)
Unfree labor during World War II
Economy of Nazi Germany
Nazi war crimes